Alberto Dualib (14 December 1919 – 13 July 2021) was a Brazilian businessman and football executive of Lebanese descent born to Lebanese Christian immigrants from Zahlé. Alberto Dualib was Sport Club Corinthians Paulista's chairman between 1993 and 2007. He worked with: Nesi Curi, Clodomil Antonio Orsi, Wilson Bento, Aurélio de Paula, Osmar Stábile, Antonio Jorge, Rachid Junior, Emerson Piovezan, Farid Zablith Filho, Jorge Agle Kalil, Francisco Teocharis Papaiordanou Jr., Ílton José da Costa, Paulino Tritapepe Neto. As the club chairman, he made a contract with Media Sports Investments, controlled by Kia Joorabchian, and with the Russian oligarch Boris Berezovsky as one of its investors. Renato Duprat was his right arm. With MSI's aid, Dualib contracted many stars for Corinthians, like: Carlos Tevez, Nilmar Honorato da Silva, Javier Mascherano, Marcelo Mattos, Roger, Gustavo Nery, Carlos Alberto and others.

He died on 13 July 2021 at the age of 101.

Titles
 FIFA Club World Cup 
 Brazilian Série A
 Brazilian Cup
 Trofeo Ramón de Carranza
 Rio-São Paulo Tournament
 São Paulo State Championship
 Dallas Cup
 Nike Cup
 Copa São Paulo de Juniores
 Bandeirantes Cup

References

External links

 Corinthians Corinthians News
 Corinthians Official Site

1919 births
2021 deaths
Sport Club Corinthians Paulista
Sportspeople from São Paulo
Brazilian people of Lebanese descent
Brazilian football chairmen and investors
Brazilian centenarians
Men centenarians
Sportspeople of Lebanese descent
20th-century Brazilian people